The 2020 West Coast Conference men's basketball tournament was the postseason men's basketball tournament for the West Coast Conference during the 2019–20 NCAA Division I men's basketball season,  held March 5–10 at the Orleans Arena in Paradise, Nevada.

Second-ranked Gonzaga won the tournament and received the conference's automatic bid to the 68-team NCAA tournament, which was cancelled due to the COVID-19 pandemic. For the second consecutive year, the Los Angeles-based University Credit Union was the title sponsor of the tournament.

Venue 
For the twelfth consecutive year, the WCC tournament was held in the Orleans Arena, with a seating capacity of 7,471 for basketball. The tournament is scheduled to be held at the Orleans Arena at least until 2022. The venue is located at the 1,886-room Orleans Hotel and Casino, about a mile (1.6 km) west of the Las Vegas Strip.

Tickets sold out for the 2020 WCC Tournament less than an hour after being made available to the public, marking the eleventh consecutive year that tickets sold out for the tournament.

Seeds 
All ten WCC teams participated in the tournament, seeded by conference record, with a tiebreaker system for identical conference records. The tournament returned to a format similar to that used from 2003 to 2011, with slight changes to the terminology used for the rounds prior to the semifinals. The 7 through 10 seeds played in the "first round", the 5 and 6 seeds started play in the "second round", and the 3 and 4 seeds started in the "third round". The top two seeds received byes into the semifinals.

Schedule

Bracket

References

Tournament
West Coast Conference men's basketball tournament
Basketball competitions in the Las Vegas Valley
College basketball tournaments in Nevada
West Coast Conference men's basketball tournament
West Coast Conference men's basketball tournament
College sports tournaments in Nevada